The Brox Sisters were an American trio of singing sisters, enjoying their greatest popularity in the 1920s and early 1930s.

Early life
The sisters were Lorayne (born Eunice, November 11, 1901 – June 14, 1993), Bobbe (born Josephine, November 28, 1902 – May 2, 1999), and Patricia (born Kathleen, June 14, 1904 – August 27, 1988).  They were born in Iowa and Indiana, grew up in Alberta and Tennessee, and retained Southern accents during their performing careers.  They began a singing career as a trio in Canada, first appearing as child performers in Mother Lang's Children's Show. 	 	

The family name "Brock" was changed to "Brox" for theater marquees.  	

They began touring the Vaudeville circuit in the 1910s in the United States and Canada. At the start of the 1920s they achieved success in New York on the Broadway stage. Near the end of the decade they relocated to Los Angeles. The act broke up in the early 1930s after the sisters got married. They made their final professional reunion appearance on radio in 1939.

Broadway

The trio performed in Irving Berlin's Music Box Revue from 1921 to 1924, at the New York Theatre. Berlin's hit song "Everybody Step" was written for and debuted by the sisters. They recorded a number of Berlin compositions, including "Bring on the Pepper," "How Many Times," "Lazy," "School House Blues," "Some Sunny Day," and "Tokio Blues."

In 1925 and 1926, they performed on Broadway in the musical comedy The Cocoanuts, with the Marx Brothers. In 1927, they appeared in the Ziegfeld Follies of 1927 at the New Amsterdam Theatre with comedian Eddie Cantor.

Film history
The Brox Sisters were among the earliest artists to appear on Warner Bros.' Vitaphone sound shorts in the late 1920s. They were featured in three productions: "Glorifying the American Song," "Down South" (both in 1928), and the 6:00 short, "Down South" (1929). None of the features currently exist in full audio and visual format, with research underway to locate missing visual or audio components."Down South" exists in camera negative at the Library of Congress and a scruffy Vitaphone disc was located by Ron Hutchinson of the Vitaphone Project, who raised funding for a restoration at UCLA Film & Television Archive circa 2018.

In 1929, they appeared in the film The Hollywood Revue of 1929, performing the songs "Singin' in the Rain" with Cliff Edwards and "Strike Up the Band" in the finale of the first act.

In 1930, the sisters appeared in the film King of Jazz. They performed the song "A Bench in the Park", with Joe Venuti and Eddie Lang, and with The Rhythm Boys (Bing Crosby, Harry Barris and Al Rinker).  In that year they also appeared in the film Spring Is Here in which they performed the song "Crying for the Carolines".

They performed "Falling in Love Again" in the movie Hollywood on Parade (1932).

Radio and recordings
The sisters also made radio broadcasts in the 1920s. They recorded a series of phonograph records for Brunswick Records and Victor Records, as well as appearing on sides for Columbia.

References

External links

 The Brox Sisters at IMDB
 Bobbe Brox at IMDB
 Kathlyn Brox at IMDB
 Lorraine Brox at IMDB
 Bobbe Brox obituary at NY Times
 Brox Sisters pages at JazzAge 1920s site
 Brock Sisters from UC to Hollywood
 Bobbie Brox obit in The Independent
 Cameo performance in King of Jazz
  (buried in Desert Memorial Park)
  (buried in Desert Memorial Park)

American pop music groups
Singers from Tennessee
American girl groups
Vaudeville performers
Burials at Desert Memorial Park
Victor Records artists
Brunswick Records artists